Michael Anthony Clevinger (born December 21, 1990) is an American professional baseball pitcher for the Chicago White Sox of Major League Baseball (MLB). He has previously played in MLB for the Cleveland Indians and San Diego Padres. Clevinger made his MLB debut in 2016.

Early life and career
Clevinger was born on December 21, 1990, in Jacksonville, Florida. He graduated from Wolfson High School in Jacksonville, Florida. He played college baseball at The Citadel before transferring to Seminole Community College after his freshman season. After the 2011 season, he played collegiate summer baseball with the Cotuit Kettleers of the Cape Cod Baseball League.

Professional career

Los Angeles Angels
The Los Angeles Angels of Anaheim selected Clevinger in the fourth round of the 2011 Major League Baseball draft. He spent 2011 with the rookie-level Orem Owlz, then was promoted to the Cedar Rapids Kernels the following year, pitching in eight games. He had elbow reconstruction surgery, and as a result only pitched in three total games in 2013.

Cleveland Indians
After pitching for two separate minor league organizations for the Angels in 2014, on August 7 he was traded to the Cleveland Indians for Vinnie Pestano. Clevinger spent 2015 with the Double-A Akron RubberDucks, going 9–8 with a 2.73 earned run average (ERA). The Indians added him to their 40-man roster after the season.

Clevinger was called up by the Indians on May 18, 2016, and made his major league debut that evening. He returned to the minor leagues after three starts, spending the next three months with the Columbus Clippers. Clevinger finished his time with Columbus with 11 wins, a loss, and a 3.00 ERA. He was called back up again on August 4, 2016, to start against the Minnesota Twins. He finished the season appearing in 17 games, 10 of them starts, going 3–3 in 53 innings. After injuries to a few starters in 2017, Clevinger stepped into the rotation and proved to be an asset for the Indians going forward. He finished with a 12–6 record in 27 games, 21 starts. He struck out 137 batters in  innings.

On August 11, 2020, Clevinger and teammate Zach Plesac were placed on the restricted list by the Indians and sent home by the team after violating COVID-19 safety protocols. Clevinger and Plesac faced significant backlash from teammates over their behavior, with Óliver Pérez announcing that he would leave the team if they returned to the roster. Teammates were also frustrated about potentially exposing Carlos Carrasco, who recently had leukemia, to the coronavirus.

San Diego Padres
On August 31, 2020, the Indians traded Clevinger, along with Greg Allen and Matt Waldron to the San Diego Padres in exchange for Austin Hedges, Josh Naylor, Cal Quantrill, and minor league players Gabriel Arias, Owen Miller, and Joey Cantillo. On November 15, 2020, Clevinger and the Padres agreed to a two-year contract extension, with annual salaries of $2 million in 2021 and $6.5 million in 2022, with a $3 million signing bonus. On the same day, it was announced that Clevinger would need to undergo Tommy John surgery and miss the 2021 season. On February 18, 2021, Clevinger was placed on the 60-day injured list as he continued to recover from Tommy John surgery.

Chicago White Sox
On December 4, 2022, Clevinger signed a one-year, $8 million contract with the Chicago White Sox with a mutual option of $12 million for the 2024 season or a $4 million buyout.

Pitching style
Clevinger's pitching repertoire includes a fastball he can throw as hard as 99 miles per hour, a curveball, a slider, and a changeup.

Personal life
Clevinger has three daughters. The first daughter was born on May 2, 2016. The second daughter was born on March 20, 2017. 

Clevinger's nickname is "Sunshine," one he received after teammates likened him to Ronnie "Sunshine" Bass from the film Remember the Titans.

On January 24, 2023, Clevinger was placed under investigation by Major League Baseball for alleged domestic violence and child abuse against his 10-month-old daughter and her mother.

References

External links

1990 births
Living people
Baseball players from Jacksonville, Florida
Major League Baseball pitchers
Cleveland Indians players
San Diego Padres players
The Citadel Bulldogs baseball players
Seminole State Raiders baseball players
Cotuit Kettleers players
Orem Owlz players
Cedar Rapids Kernels players
Arizona League Angels players
Burlington Bees players
Carolina Mudcats players
Inland Empire 66ers of San Bernardino players
Akron RubberDucks players
Columbus Clippers players